Halicephalobus is a genus of nematodes belonging to the family Panagrolaimidae.

The genus has almost cosmopolitan distribution.

Species:

Halicephalobus gingivalis 
Halicephalobus intermedius 
Halicephalobus laticauda 
Halicephalobus limuli 
Halicephalobus persicus 
Halicephalobus mephisto

References

Nematodes